Lecithocera rotundata is a moth in the family Lecithoceridae. It is found in Taiwan and Zhejiang and Jiangxi provinces of China.

The wingspan is 13 mm.

References

Moths described in 1978
rotundata